Old North Cemetery is a historic cemetery on North State Street in Concord, New Hampshire. Established in 1730, it is the city's oldest cemetery. Franklin Pierce, fourteenth president of the United States, is buried in the cemetery, as are his wife Jane and two of his three sons. It was listed on the National Register of Historic Places on November 9, 2008. The cemetery continues to accept new burials.

Description and history
The Old North Cemetery is located north of modern downtown Concord, and a short way west of Concord's historic early town center. Iron fencing lines both of these street-facing boundaries, with a gate flanked by stone piers on North State Street serving as the main pedestrian access point. Vehicular access is through an entrance at the northern end of the North State Street frontage, from which a paved lane extends straight westward to a secondary gate at Bradley Street.

Concord was chartered in 1725, and settlement began soon afterward. The eastern portion of the cemetery was laid out in 1730, and its oldest dated burial occurred in 1736. Significant enlargements took place with the Minot Enclosure (1860), and the combining with an adjacent Quaker cemetery in the early 20th century. The single most notable burial is that of President Franklin Pierce; other notable burials include Governors David L. Morril and Matthew Harvey, as well as Lewis Downing, founder of the Abbot-Downing Company and creator of the Concord coach.

See also
 National Register of Historic Places listings in Merrimack County, New Hampshire

References

External links

 
 

Properties of religious function on the National Register of Historic Places in New Hampshire
Buildings and structures in Concord, New Hampshire
Cemeteries in New Hampshire
Cemeteries on the National Register of Historic Places in New Hampshire
Tourist attractions in Concord, New Hampshire
National Register of Historic Places in Concord, New Hampshire
Tombs of presidents of the United States
Cemeteries established in the 18th century
1730 establishments in the Thirteen Colonies